The Hidalgo Formation is a geologic formation of Maastrichtian age (latest Cretaceous) in southwestern New Mexico. It is of interest to geologists for the clues it preserves of the nature of Laramide deformation in the latest Cretaceous.

Description
Argon-argon dating gives a consistent age between 70.53 and 71.44 million years. The formation is overlain by the Rubio Peak Formation.

The formation is interpreted as a volcanic center located inland of the southwest coast of the Ringbone depositional basin that erupted during Laramide tectonic deformation that partitioned the basin. It may correlate with the Salero Formation of southeastern Arizona.

History of investigation
The formation was first named the Hidalgo Volcanics by Samuel G. Lasky in 1978 for outcroups found throughout Hidalgo County, New Mexico.

References 

Cretaceous formations of New Mexico